Adenocauda is a genus of acoels belonging to the family Haploposthiidae.

Species:
 Adenocauda helgolandica Dörjes, 1968

References

Acoelomorphs